D. laeta may refer to:

 Davidia laeta, a deciduous tree
 Downingia laeta, a bellflower native to western North America